Vattakudi-North is an agricultural village in Pattukkottai taluk of Thanjavur district, located in the delta of Cauvery river. Pattukottai is the nearest town, which lies some 10 km to the west. Farming and related activities constitute the core economic drivers of this pastoral village. It comes under Pattukottai legislative constituency and Tanjore Parliament constituency. Vattakudi North is one of the 32 villages of Musugundan Community.

Society
Like any other typical village in Tamil Nadu country side, majority of the people in Vattakudi-North belong to the farming community and the rest of them play supporting roles. The society is organized mainly on caste lines. Caste plays a vital role in social life and caste determines people's social status irrespective of their economic status.

Population
According to the latest census done by Government of India, Vattakudi- North has total population of 2672 in 410 households. 1593 Males and 1079 Females.

Religion
The villagers are mostly Hindus with Muslims and Christians as minorities.

Local administration
Vattakudi- North is a designated Panchayat. Currently the office of the Leader of the Panchayat is held by MEIYANATHAN VEERASAMY. It is part of the Pattukkottai Assembly constituency with K. Annadurai (DMK) as the MLA.

Agriculture and economy
Agriculture has been the mainstay of the village economy. Vattakudi- North is situated at the tail end of the new delta region of Cauvery irrigation scheme. This scheme was introduced in this region during the 1930s through Cauvery Mettur Project (CMP) canal and prior to this agriculture was only rainfed.  Rice based cropping system was predominant with rice – rice – pulse or groundnut sequence, during Kuruvai, Thaladi and Summer seasons, respectively. In some spots where tank (lake) irrigation possibility was available rice – rice – rice (three rice crops) sequence was also practiced during Kuruvai, Thaladi and Summer seasons, respectively.  Irrigated agriculture flourished and brought wealth to the farmers until the late 1970s and early 1980s and afterward due to the interstate dispute on sharing of Cauvery water between Tamil Nadu and Karnataka, the reach of river water to the tail end canals of Vattakudi became uncertain and if at all reaches it is only unseasonal. Therefore, to keep the mainstay profession moving and lack of expertise to go for alternative off farm income generation enterprises farmers of this village have resorted to deep bore wells for irrigation. However, in the absence of proper plans to recharge ground water with rain water received during rainy season, the present mode of agriculture using ground water from deep bore wells pose an environmental problem of sea water intrusion into the ground water and the consequent salinization of soils of the entire village.

In recent times, most of the garden as well as wet lands are converted into coconut farms. Unlike rice cultivation, coconut provides year-round income and requires less intensive labor work. With the day by day rise in the cost production of coconut and its volatile price in domestic and international  market the sustainability of income from coconut farms is increasingly become uncertain. Industries to value add coconut produce seems to be the main and the only available optional initiative that can sustain the economy of this village. 

There are few grocery stores and other type of retail stores in addition to small-time restaurants and tea shops in Vattakudi- North.

Education
There is no official statistics available on the literacy rate of Vattakudi- North village. However, traditionally people in this village have not given primary focus to education. The situation is changing in recent years, with parents insisting that their children complete for at least college degrees. Following are the educational institutions functioning in Vattakudi- North.

 Government High School – Tamil  Medium
 Panchayat Union Primary School, – Tamil Medium

Landmark

Sri Kalyana Supramaniyar Kovil
Sri Kalyana Supramaniyar Kovil is the main temple in Vattakudi- North and the largest and  oldest one. A fortnight long festival is celebrated in the month of Mar-Apr panguni uthiram( பங்குனி உத்திரம்). The festival coincides panguni uthiram.

Sri Vinayagar Kovil
A fortnight long festival is celebrated in the month of Sep vinayagar chaturthi. The festival coincides vinayagar chaturthi. The festival is celebrated in public and at home. The public celebration involves installing clay images of Ganesha in public pandals (temporary shrines) and group worship. At home, an appropriately-sized clay image is installed and worshiped with family and friends. At the end of the festival, the idols are immersed (and dissolve) in a body of water such as a lake or pond

References

Villages in Thanjavur district